The Atlantic Steam Navigation Company (colloquially known as The Galway Line) was a transatlantic shipping company operating out of Galway City between the years 1858 and 1864.
It had seventeen ships, steampowered with sails. Mechanical propulsion was by means of either paddle wheel or propeller.

Ships
 Indian Empire
 Antelope
 Prince Albert
 Propeller
 Pacific
 Circassian
 Adelaide
 Argo
 Jason
 Brazil
 Golden Fleece
 Panama
 Connaught
 Columbia
 Adriatic
 Hibernia
 Anglia

References

Shipping companies of Ireland